The Kingston Trio (Nick Bob John) (more commonly known as Nick Bob John) is an album by the American folk music group the Kingston Trio, released in 1964 (see 1964 in music). Nick Bob John failed to reach the Top 40, peaking at number 53 on the Billboard Pop Albums chart.

History
The Kingston Trio (Nick Bob John) was the trio's first release on the Decca label after seven years, 19 albums and worldwide record sales in the tens of millions (three million on "Tom Dooley" alone) with Capitol Records.  The names are those of the Trio's members, Nick Reynolds, Bob Shane, and John Stewart.

Two singles were released: "My Ramblin' Boy" b/w "Hope You Understand" and "I'm Going Home" b/w "Little Play Soldiers". Neither single, and notably, none of the Decca singles, reached the Top 100 in the charts.

The album was produced by Frank Werber, the Trio's manager since its inception.

"I'm Going Home", by Fred Geis, remained a concert favorite of the Trio in this and future incarnations of the group, sometimes re-titled "California". Geis was the subject of a lawsuit over the melody resembling music from the Broadway musical Milk and Honey by Jerry Herman.

Reception

In his Allmusic review, music critic Bruce Eder called the album "one of the strongest albums of the group's entire history, containing an embarrassment of riches among its original dozen songs. And it's also a surprisingly contemporary record for a group that was supposedly long past its prime in 1965..." but noted the sound quality was "a little flat-sounding compared with the group's prior work at Capitol's studios..."

Reissues
Nick Bob John was reissued on a remastered CD in 1991 along with two bonus tracks on the Folk Era label.
In 2000, all of the tracks from Nick Bob John were included in The Stewart Years 10-CD box set issued by Bear Family Records.
Nick Bob John was reissued on CD in 2002 by Folk Era along with the rest of their Decca releases on The Decca Years.

Track listing

Side one

 "Midnight Special" (Lead Belly) – 2:07
 "Love's Been Good to Me" (Rod McKuen) – 3:05
 "Poverty Hill" (Fred Hellerman, Fran Minkoff) – 3:22
 "Someday Soon" (Ian Tyson) – 2:49
 "Gotta Travel On" (Paul Clayton, Larry Ehrlich, Ronnie Gilbert, Lee Hays, Fred Hellerman, Dave Lazar, Pete Seeger) – 3:18
 "Hope You Understand" (John Stewart) – 2:20

Side two

 "Little Play Soldiers" (Martin Cooper) – 2:20
 "Love Comes a Trickling Down" (Jonathan Harris) – 2:53
 "My Ramblin' Boy" (Tom Paxton) – 3:42
 "More Poems" (Mason Williams) – 1:42
 "Farewell (Fare Thee Well)" (Bob Dylan) – 3:16
 "I'm Going Home" (Fred Geis) – 2:22
1991 reissue bonus tracks:
 "Long Time Blues" (Williams) – 2:21
 "Come Gather the Time" (Stewart) – 2:26

Personnel
Bob Shane – vocals, guitar
Nick Reynolds – vocals, tenor guitar
John Stewart – vocals, banjo, guitar
Dean Reilly – bass

Production notes
Frank Werber – producer
Bob Norberg – engineer

Chart positions

References

1964 albums
The Kingston Trio albums
Decca Records albums